Eddy Wilson may refer to:

 Eddy Elbridge Wilson (died 1961), member of the former Oregon State Game Commission, namesake of the E. E. Wilson Wildlife Area
 Eddy Wilson (American football) (born 1997), American football defensive tackle